Sir Edward Turnor or Turnour (1617 – 4 March 1676) of Little Parndon, Essex was a Speaker of the House of Commons of England.

Early life
Edward Turnor was son of Arthur Turnor of Little Parndon. Passing from John Roysse's Free School in Abingdon (now Abingdon School) in 1632  to Queen's College, Oxford. He succeeded his father to the estate at Little Parndon in 1651.

Career

He became a barrister, called at Middle Temple, and Member of Parliament in turn for Essex (1654–1661) and Hertford (1661–1671). It was while Turnor sat for Hertford that he served as Speaker of the Commons (1661–1671) and Solicitor General (1670–1671). He was knighted in (1660).

According to Geoffrey Robertson (in his book, The Tyrannicide Brief), a "Sir Edward Turner" (sic) was a "Counsel for the Victim" (the Duke of York) in the 1660 regicide trials. Evidence supporting the argument that Robertson misspelt "Turnour" as "Turner" includes the entry for Sir Edward Turnour provided in "The judges of England, from the time of the Conquest" by Edward Foss.

Turnor was one of the judges appointed under the Fire of London Disputes Act 1666 to deal with property disputes arising as a result of the Great Fire of London.

He died on circuit in Bedford on 4 Mar 1676 and was buried at Little Parndon. He had married twice and left 2 sons and 2 daughters.

His son Edward Turnour was MP for Orford, Suffolk, and married Isobel Keith, daughter of William Keith, 6th Earl Marischal.

See also
 List of Old Abingdonians

References

1617 births
1676 deaths
People from Harlow
People educated at Abingdon School
Alumni of The Queen's College, Oxford
Members of the Middle Temple
English MPs 1654–1655
English MPs 1656–1658
English MPs 1659
English MPs 1660
English MPs 1661–1679
Speakers of the House of Commons of England
Solicitors General for England and Wales
Chief Barons of the Exchequer